Santiago González and Aisam-ul-Haq Qureshi were the defending champions, but Qureshi chose to not play this year.
González participated with Horacio Zeballos, but they lost to Torres and van der Merwe in the semifinal.
Márcio Torres and Izak van der Merwe became the new champions, after withdrawal of Juan-Pablo Amado and Eduardo Schwank before the final match.

Seeds

Draw

Draw

References
 Doubles Draw

BH Tennis Open International Cup - Doubles
BH Tennis Open International Cup